Kissos Kissonerga is a Cypriot association football club based in Kissonerga, located in the Paphos District. Its colours are green, yellow, and red. It has 1 participations in Cypriot Fourth Division. In 2007, the team merged with AEM Mesogis to form Kissos FC Kissonergas. In 2014, Kissos FC Kissonergas dissolved and Kissos Kissonerga was re-founded.

References
 

Football clubs in Cyprus
Association football clubs established in 1990
1990 establishments in Cyprus